The list of primary schools in Hong Kong is arranged by 18 districts of Hong Kong. It includes government schools, aided schools, Direct Subsidy Scheme (DSS) schools, private schools, as well as English Schools Foundation (ESF) schools and other international schools.

Primary schools in Hong Kong

Central and Western District
Primary schools in Central and Western District:
Bonham Road Government Primary School
Carmel School, Hong Kong
Catholic Mission School
Central and Western District St. Anthony's School
Chiu Sheung School, Hong Kong
German Swiss International School
Glenealy School - an English Schools Foundation school
The Harbour School
Hong Kong Academy
Island Christian Academy
Kau Yan School
King's College Old Boys' Association Primary School
King's College Old Boys' Association Primary School No.2
Li Sing Primary School
North Point Government Primary School (Cloud View Road)
Peak School - an English Schools Foundation school
Sacred Heart Canossian School
Sacred Heart Canossian School, Private Section
San Wui Commercial Society School
Sheng Kung Hui Kei Yan Primary School
Sheng Kung Hui Lui Ming Choi Memorial Primary School
Sheng Kung Hui St. Matthew's Primary School
Sheng Kung Hui St. Peter's Primary School
St. Anthony's School, Hong Kong
St. Charles School
St. Clare's Primary School
St. Louis School (Primary Section)
St. Stephen's Girls' Primary School
St. Paul's Primary School

Eastern District 
Primary schools in Eastern District:
Aldrich Bay Government Primary School
Buddhist Chung Wah Kornhill Primary School
Canossa School (Hong Kong)
Caritas Lok Yi School - special-needs school for intellectual disability
CCC Kei Wan Primary School
CCC Kei Wan Primary School (Aldrich Bay)
Chan's Creative School (Hong Kong Island)
Chinese International School
Chinese Methodist School (North Point)
Chinese Methodist School, Tanner Hill
Delia School of Canada
ELCHK Faith Love Lutheran School
Endeavour Leung Lee Sau Yu Memorial Primary School
Grace Christian Academy
HKCWC Hioe Tjo Yoeng Primary School
HKUGA Primary School
Hon Wah College (Primary Section)
International Montessori School - an IMEF School
Kiangsu and Chekiang Primary School
Meng Tak Catholic School
North Point Government Primary School
North Point Methodist Primary School
Po Leung Kuk Yu Lee Mo Fan Memorial School - special-needs school for intellectual disability
Pui Kiu Primary School
Quarry Bay School - an English Schools Foundation school
Rotary Club of Hong Kong Island West Hong Chi Morninghope School - special-needs school for intellectual disability
Salesian English School
The Salvation Army Ann Wyllie Memorial School
The Salvation Army Centaline Charity Fund School
Shanghai Alumni Primary School
Shau Kei Wan Government Primary School
Shaukiwan Tsung Tsin School
Sheng Kung Hui Chai Wan St. Michael's Primary School
Sheng Kung Hui St. Michael's Primary School
St. Mark's Primary School
Taikoo Primary School

Islands District 
Primary schools in Islands District:
Bui O Public School
CCC Cheung Chau Church Kam Kong Primary School
CCC Tai O Primary School
Cheung Chau Sacred Heart School
Ching Chung Hau Po Woon Primary School
Discovery Bay International School
Discovery College - replaced from Bauhinia School (an English Schools Foundation school) in August 2007. This school is the new private independent school of ESF
Discovery Mind Primary School
HKFEW Wong Cho Bau School
Hong Kong International Learning Academy (HKILA) - Discovery Bay
Ho Yu College and Primary School (Sponsored by Sik Sik Yuen)
Holy Family School, Hong Kong
Kwok Man School
Kind Hing Trinity International Kindergarten and Nursery
Lantau International School
Ling Liang Church Sau Tak Primary School
Mui Wo School
Mui Wo OWLS School
Northern Lamma School
Po On Commercial Association Wan Ho Kan Primary School
Salvation Army Lam Butt Chung Memorial School
Sheng Kung Hui Wei Lun Primary School
Tung Chung Catholic School
Tung Wan Mok Law Shui Wah School - school for social development

Kowloon City District 
Primary schools in Kowloon City District:
Alliance Primary School Kowloon Tong
Alliance Primary School, Whampoa
Aoi Pui School, Kowloon
American International School (Primary Branch)
Australian International School Hong Kong
Beacon Hill School - an English Schools Foundation school
CCC Kei Wa Primary School (Kowloon Tong)
CCC Wanchai Church Kei To Primary School (Kowloon City)
Chan Sui Ki (La Salle) Primary School
Christian Alliance P. C. Lau Memorial International School
Creative Primary School
Diocesan Boys' School Primary Division
Diocesan Preparatory School
ELCHK Hung Hom Lutheran Primary School
Emmanuel Primary School, Kowloon
Farm Road Government Primary School
First Assembly of God Primary School and Kindergarten
GCEPSA Whampoa Primary School
Heep Yunn Primary School
Holy Angels Canossian School
Holy Carpenter Primary School
Holy Family Canossian School
Holy Family Canossian School (Kowloon Tong)
Holy Trinity Primary School
Hop Yat Church School
Iu Shan School
Jockey Club Sarah Roe School - an English Schools Foundation school for special educational needs
Kingston International School
Kowloon Junior School - an English Schools Foundation school (for P1 through P3 pupils)
Kowloon Tong Funful English Primary School
Kowloon Tong Government Primary School
Kowloon Tong School (Primary Section)
Kowloon True Light Middle School (Primary Section)
La Salle Primary School
Ling To Catholic Primary School
Lok Sin Tong Primary School
Ma Tau Chung Government Primary School
Ma Tau Chung Government Primary School (Hung Hom Bay)
Mary Rose School - special-needs school for intellectual disability
Maryknoll Convent School (Primary Section)
Munsang College Primary School
Oblate Primary School
Oxbridge British School
Po Leung Kuk Camoes Tan Siu Lin Primary School
Po Leung Kuk Lam Man Chan English Primary School
Po Leung Kuk Madam Chan Wai Chow Memorial School
Pooi To Primary School
Pui Ching Primary School
Sear Rogers International School - Peninsula
Sheng Kung Hui Fung Kei Millennium Primary School
Sheng Kung Hui Fung Kei Primary School
Sheng Kung Hui Good Shepherd Primary School
St. Eugene De Mazenod Oblate Primary School
St. Johannes College (Primary Section)
St. Rose of Lima's School
Think International School
Yew Chung International School

Kwai Tsing District 
Primary schools in Kwai Tsing District:
Asbury Methodist Primary School
Buddhist Lam Bing Yim Memorial School (Sponsored by HKBA)
Buddhist Lim Kim Tian Memorial Primary School
CCC Chuen Yuen Second Primary School
CCC Kei Chun Primary School
Cho Yiu Catholic Primary School
CNEC Lui Ming Choi Primary School
CNEC Ta Tung School
Delia (Man Kiu) English Primary School
ELCHK Kwai Shing Lutheran Primary School
Father Cucchiara Memorial School
HKSYC & IA Chan Nam Chong Memorial School - special-needs school for intellectual disability
Hong Chi Winifred Mary Cheung Morn School - special-needs school for intellectual disability
Lutheran School for the Deaf - special-needs school for hearing impairment
Po Leung Kuk Castar Primary School
Po Leung Kuk Chan Yat Primary School
Po Leung Kuk Mr. and Mrs. Chan Pak Keung Tsing Yi School - special-needs school for intellectual disability
Salesian Yip Hon Millennium Primary School
Salesian Yip Hon Primary School
Sam Shui Natives Association Lau Pun Cheung School - special-needs school for intellectual disability
Shek Lei Catholic Primary School
Shek Lei St. John's Catholic Primary School
Sheng Kung Hui Chu Oi Primary School
Sheng Kung Hui Chu Yan Primary School
Sheng Kung Hui Ho Chak Wan Primary School
Sheng Kung Hui Tsing Yi Chu Yan Primary School
Sheng Kung Hui Tsing Yi Estate Ho Chak Wan Primary School
Sheng Kung Hui Yan Laap Memorial Primary School
Sheng Kung Hui Yan Laap Primary School
Spastics Association of Hong Kong B. M. Kotewall Memorial School - special-needs school for physical disability
SRBCEPSA Lee Yat Ngok Memorial School
Tsing Yi Trade Association Primary School
Tsuen Wan Trade Association Primary School
Tung Wah Group of Hospitals Chow Yin Sum Primary School
Tung Wah Group of Hospitals Ko Ho Ning Memorial Primary School
Tung Wah Group of Hospitals Wong See Sum Primary School
Yan Chai Hospital Chiu Tsang Hok Wan Primary School

Kwun Tong District 
Primary schools in Kwun Tong District:
Bishop Paschang Catholic School
Buddhist Chi King Primary School
Carmel Leung Sing Tak School
CCC Kei Faat Primary School
CCC Kei Faat Primary School (Yau Tong)
CCC Kei Shun Special School - special-needs school for intellectual disability
Conservative Baptist Lui Ming Choi Primary School
Evan China Fellowship Holy Word School - special-needs school for intellectual disability
Fukien Secondary School Affiliated School
Hong Kong Red Cross Princess Alexandra School - special-needs school for physical disability
Hong Kong Taoist Association Wun Tsuen School
Hong Kong Taoist Association the Yuen Yuen Institute Chan Lui Chung Tak Memorial School
Jordan Valley St. Joseph's Catholic Primary School
Kowloon Bay St. John the Baptist Catholic Primary School
Kwun Tong Government Primary School
Kwun Tong Government Primary School (Sau Ming Road)
Lam Tin Methodist Primary School
Lok Sin Tong Yeung Chung Ming Primary School
Lok Wah Catholic Primary School
Man Kiu Association Primary School
Mission Covenant Church Holm Glad Primary School
Our Lady of China Catholic Primary School
Ping Shek Estate Catholic Primary School
Sau Mau Ping Catholic Primary School
Sau Ming Primary School
Sheng Kung Hui Kei Hin Primary School
Sheng Kung Hui Kei Lok Primary School
Sheng Kung Hui Kowloon Bay Kei Lok Primary School
Sheng Kung Hui Lee Shiu Keung Primary School
Sheng Kung Hui St. John's Primary School
Sheng Kung Hui Tak Tin Lee Shiu Keung Primary School
Sheng Kung Hui Yautong Kei Hin Primary School
Society of Boys' Centres Shing Tak Centre School - school for social development
St. Antonius Primary School
St. Edward's Catholic Primary School
St. John the Baptist Catholic Primary School
St. Joseph's Anglo-Chinese Primary School
St. Matthew's Lutheran School (Sau Mau Ping)

North District 
Primary schools in North District:
Alliance Primary School, Sheung Shui
Fanling Assembly of God Church Primary School
Fanling Government Primary School
Fanling Public School
FSFTF Fong Shu Chuen Primary School
Fung Kai Innovative School
Fung Kai Liu Yun-sum Memorial School
Fung Kai No.1 Primary School
HHCKLA Buddhist Chan Shi Wan Primary School
HHCKLA Buddhist Ching Kok Lin Association School
HHCKLA Buddhist Po Kwong School - special-needs school for intellectual disability
HHCKLA Buddhist Wisdom Primary School
Kam Tsin Village Ho Tung School
Lee Chi Tat Memorial School
Pentecostal Gin Mao Sheng Primary School
Pentecostal Yu Leung Fat Primary School
Pui Ling School of the Precious Blood
Salvation Army Shek Wu School - special-needs school for intellectual disability
Sha Tau Kok Central Primary School
Shan Tsui Public School
Shek Wu Hui Public School
Sheng Kung Hui Ka Fuk Wing Chun Primary School
Sheng Kung Hui Wing Chun Primary School
Ta Ku Ling Ling Ying Public School
Tsang Mui Millennium School
Tung Koon School
Tung Wah Group of Hospitals Hong Kong and Kowloon Electrical Appliances Merchants Association Ltd. School
Tung Wah Group of Hospitals Ma Kam Chan Memorial Primary School
Wai Chow Public School (Sheung Shui)
Yuk Yin School

Sai Kung District 
Primary schools in Sai Kung District:
Assembly of God Leung Sing Tak Primary School
Chi Lin Buddhist Primary School
Christian and Missionary Alliance Sun Kei Primary School
Clearwater Bay School - an English Schools Foundation school
Evangel College
G. T. (Ellen Yeung) College
Haven of Hope Sunnyside School - special-needs school for intellectual disability
HHCKLA Buddhist Wong Cho Sum School
HKCCC Union Logos Academy
Hong Chi Morninghill School, Tsui Lam - special-needs school for intellectual disability
Hong Kong Adventist Academy - a private school
Hong Kong and Macau Lutheran Church Ming Tao Primary School
Hong Kong and Macau Lutheran Church Primary School
King Lam Catholic Primary School
Lok Sin Tong Lau Tak Primary School
Po Leung Kuk Fung Ching Memorial Primary School
Po Leung Kuk Luk Hing Too Primary School
Po Leung Kuk Wong Wing Shu Primary School
Pok Oi Hospital Chan Kwok Wai Primary School
Sai Kung Central Lee Siu Yam Memorial School
Sai Kung Sung Tsun Catholic School (Primary Section)
Sheng Kung Hui Tseung Kwan O Kei Tak Primary School
Shun Tak Fraternal Association Leung Kit Wah Primary School
Shrewsbury International School Hong Kong
St. Andrew's Catholic Primary School
Tseung Kwan O Catholic Primary School
Tseung Kwan O Government Primary School
Tseung Kwan O Methodist Primary School
Tseung Kwan O Pui Chi School - special-needs school for intellectual disability
Tung Wah Group of Hospitals Wong Yee Jar Jat Memorial Primary School
Yan Chai Hospital Chan Iu Seng Primary School
Yan Oi Tong Tin Ka Ping Primary School

Sha Tin District 
Primary schools in Sha Tin District:
Anfield School
Baptist (Sha Tin Wai) Lui Ming Choi Primary School
Baptist Lui Ming Choi Primary School
Caritas Lok Jun School - special-needs school for intellectual disability
Caritas Resurrection School - special-needs school for intellectual disability
Carmel Alison Lam Primary School
Chi Hong Primary School
Choi Jun School - special-needs school for intellectual disability
Christian Alliance H. C. Chan Primary School
Christian Alliance Toi Shan H. C. Chan Primary School
CUHKFAA Thomas Cheung School
Dr. Catherine F. Woo Memorial School
ELCHK Ma On Shan Lutheran Primary School
ELCHK Wo Che Lutheran School
Free Methodist Bradbury Chun Lei Primary School
Free Methodist Mei Lam Primary School
GCC & ITKD Cheong Wong Wai Primary School
Hong Kong Baptist University Affiliated School Wong Kam Fai Secondary and Primary School
Hong Kong Taoist Association Shun Yeung Primary School
Immaculate Heart of Mary School
International Christ School
Kowloon City Baptist Church Hay Nien (Yan Ping) Primary School
Kowloon City Baptist Church Hay Nien Primary School
Leung Kui Kau Lutheran Primary School
The Little Flower's Catholic Primary School
Lung Kong WFSL Wong Yiu Nam Primary School
Ma On Shan Ling Liang Primary School
Ma On Shan Methodist Primary School
Ma On Shan St. Joseph's Primary School
Ng Clan's Association Tai Pak Memorial School
Po Leung Kuk Chee Jing Yin Primary School
Po Leung Kuk Chong Kee Ting Primary School
Po Leung Kuk Dr. Jimmy Wong Chi-ho (Tin Sum Valley) Primary School
Po Leung Kuk Riverain Primary School
Po Leung Kuk Siu Hon-sum Primary School
Pui Kiu College
Renaissance College - a private school operated by the ESF Educational Services Ltd after 2006
Salvation Army Tin Ka Ping School
Sha Tin Government Primary School
Sha Tin Methodist Primary School
Sha Tin Wai Dr. Catherine F. Woo Memorial School
Shatin Junior School - an English Schools Foundation school
Shatin Public School - special-needs school for intellectual disability
Shatin Tsung Tsin School
Sheng Kung Hui Holy Spirit Primary School (Shatin)
Sheng Kung Hui Ma On Shan Holy Spirit Primary School
Spastics Association Hong Kong Ko Fook Iu Memorial School - special-needs school for physical disability
Stewards Pooi Kei Primary School
Tung Wah Group of Hospitals Sin Chu Wan Primary School

Sham Shui Po District 
Primary schools in Sham Shui Po District:
Bloom KKCA Academy
St. Francis of Assisi's English Primary School
Alliance Primary School, Tai Hang Tung
Caritas Jockey Club Lok Yan School - special-needs school for intellectual disability
CCC Heep Woh Primary School (Cheung Sha Wan)
Chan's Creative School
Chi Yun School - special-needs school for intellectual disability
Delia English Primary School and Kindergarten
ELCHK Faith Lutheran School
Five Districts Business Welfare Association School
Fuk Wing Street Government Primary School
Good Counsel Catholic Primary School
HKSYC & IA San Wui Commercial Society School
Hoi Ping Chamber of Commerce Primary School
Ka Ling School of the Precious Blood
Kowloon Junior School - an English Schools Foundation school (for P4 through P6 pupils)
Kowloon Rhenish School
Laichikok Catholic Primary School
Li Cheng Uk Government Primary School
In 1994 it had significant numbers of students with origins from India and the Philippines.
Lingnan University Alumni Association (HK) Primary School
Maryknoll Fathers' School (Primary Section)
Mental Health Association of Hong Kong - Cornwall School - special-needs school for intellectual disability
Pak Tin Catholic Primary School
Po Leung Kuk Choi Kai Yau School
Saviour Lutheran School - special-needs school for intellectual disability
Sham Shui Po Government Primary School
Sham Shui Po Kaifong Welfare Association Primary School
Sheng Kung Hui Kei Fook Primary School
Sheng Kung Hui Kei Oi Primary School
Sheng Kung Hui St. Andrew's Primary School
Sheng Kung Hui St. Clement's Primary School
Sheng Kung Hui St. Thomas' Primary School
Society of Boys' Centres Chak Yan Centre School - school for social development
St. Francis of Assisi's Caritas School
St. Francis of Assisi's English Primary School
St. Margaret's Co-educational English Secondary and Primary School
Tack Ching Primary School
Tak Nga Primary School
Tsung Tsin Primary School And Kindergarten
Tung Wah Group of Hospitals Kwan Fong Kai Chi School - special-needs school for intellectual disability
Ying Wa Primary School

Southern District 
Primary schools in Southern District:
Aberdeen St. Peter's Catholic Primary School
Apleichau St. Peter's Catholic Primary School
Aplichau Kaifong Primary School
Canadian International School
Ebenezer New Hope School - special-needs school for visual impairment
Ebenezer School - special-needs school for visual impairment
Hong Kong International School
Hong Kong Red Cross John F. Kennedy Centre- special-needs school for physical disability
Hong Kong Southern District Government Primary School
The Independent Schools Foundation Academy
Island Road Government Primary School
Kellett School
Kennedy School - an English Schools Foundation school
Marycove School - school for social development
Precious Blood Primary School (South Horizons)
Precious Blood Primary School (Wah Fu Estate)
Pui Tak Canossian Primary School
Sheng Kung Hui Chi Fu Chi Nam Primary School
Sheng Kung Hui Tin Wan Chi Nam Primary School
Singapore International School
South Island School - an English Schools Foundation school
St. Paul's Co-educational College Primary School
St. Peter's Catholic Primary School
St. Stephen's College Preparatory School
St. Teresa's School
Tung Wah Group of Hospitals Hok Shan School
Tung Wah Group of Hospitals Tsui Tsin Tong School - special-needs school for intellectual disability
Victoria Shanghai Academy

Tai Po District 
Primary schools in Tai Po District:
Hong Chi Pinehill School - special-needs school for intellectual disability
Hong Chi Pinehill No.2 School - special-needs school for intellectual disability
Hong Chi Pinehill No.3 School - special-needs school for intellectual disability
Hong Kong and Kowloon Kaifong Women's Association Sun Fong Chung Primary School
Hong Kong Taoist Association Wun Tsuen Ng Lai Wo Memorial School
Hong Lok Yuen International School
Japanese International School
Lam Tsuen Public Wong Fook Luen Memorial School
Norwegian International School
NTW & JWA Leung Sing Tak Primary School
Po Leung Kuk Tin Ka Ping Millennium Primary School
Po Leung Kuk Tin Ka Ping Primary School
Sacred Heart of Mary Catholic Primary School
Sam Shui Natives Association Huen King Wing School
Sheng Kung Hui Yuen Chen Maun Chen Jubilee Primary School
Sheng Kung Hui Yuen Chen Maun Chen Primary School
Spastics Association Hong Kong Jockey Club Elaine Field School - special-needs school for physical disability
Sung Tak School
Sung Tak Wong Kin Sheung Memorial School
Tai Po Baptist Public School
Tai Po Government Primary School
Tai Po Methodist School
Tai Po Old Market Public School
Tai Po Old Market Public School (Plover Cove)
The Education University of Hong Kong Jockey Club Primary School
Yan Chai Hospital Choi Hin To Primary School

Tsuen Wan District 
Primary schools in Tsuen Wan District:
CCC Chuen Yuen First Primary School
CCC Kei Wai Primary School
CCC Kei Wai Primary School (Ma Wan)
Chai Wan Kok Catholic Primary School
Emmanuel Primary School
Ho Shun Primary School (Sponsored by Sik Sik Yuen)
Hoi Pa Street Government Primary School
Holy Cross Lutheran School
Hong Kong Baptist Convention Primary School
Hong Kong Taoist Association the Yuen Yuen Institute Shek Wai Kok Primary School
Kwai-ming Wu Memorial School of Precious Blood
Lei Muk Shue Catholic Primary School
Mary of Providence Primary School
Rosebud Primary School
Shak Chung Shan Memorial Catholic Primary School
Sham Tseng Catholic Primary School
Sheng Kung Hui Chu Oi Primary School (Lei Muk Shue)
Si Yuan School of the Precious Blood
Tsuen Wan Catholic Primary School 
Tsuen Wan Chiu Chow Public School
Tsuen Wan Government Primary School
Tsuen Wan Public Ho Chuen Yiu Memorial Primary School

Tuen Mun District 
Primary schools in Tuen Mun District:
AD & FD POHL Mrs. Cheng Yam On Millennium School
AD & FD POHL Mrs. Cheng Yam On School
Buddhist Lau Tin Sang Primary School
Castle Peak Catholic Primary School
CCC But San Primary School
CCC Hoh Fuk Tong Primary School
CCC Mong Wong Far Yok Memorial Primary School
FDBWA Chow Chin Yau School
Harrow International School Hong Kong
Hing Tak School
HKRSS Tuen Mun Primary School
Hong Chi Morninghill School, Tuen Mun - special-needs school for intellectual disability
Hong Chi Morninghope School, Tuen Mun - special-needs school for intellectual disability
Hong Chi Morninglight School, Tuen Mun - special-needs school for intellectual disability
Hong Kong Christian Service Pui Oi School - special-needs school for physical disability
Hong Kong Eng Clansman Association Wu Si Chong Memorial School
Hong Kong Red Swastika Society Tuen Mun Primary School
Islamic Primary School
Lok Sin Tong Leung Wong Wai Fong Memorial School
Lui Cheung Kwong Lutheran Primary School
Lung Kong WFSL Lau Tak Yung Memorial Primary School
Lutheran Tsang Shing Siu Leun School
Po Leung Kuk Fong Wong Kam Chuen Primary School
Po Leung Kuk Hong Kong Taoist Association Yuen Yuen Primary School
Po Leung Kuk Horizon East Primary School
Po Leung Kuk Leung Chow Shun Kam Primary School
Po Leung Kuk Vicwood KT Chong No.2 Primary School
R. T. C. Gaia School
Sheng Kung Hui Mung Yan Primary School
Shun Tak Fraternal Association Ho Yat Tung Primary School
Shun Tak Fraternal Association Lee Kam Primary School
Shun Tak Fraternal Association Wu Siu Kui Memorial Primary School
SRBCEPSA Ho Sau Ki School
Taoist Ching Chung Primary School
Taoist Ching Chung Primary School (Wu King Estate)
Toi Shan Association Primary School
Tuen Mun Government Primary School
Tung Wah Group of Hospitals Tang Shiu Kin Primary School
Yan Chai Hospital Ho Sik Nam Primary School
Yan Chai Hospital Law Chan Chor Si Primary School
Yan Oi Tong Madam Lau Wong Fat Primary School
Yan Tak Catholic Primary School

Wan Chai District 
Primary schools in Wan Chai District:
Autism Partnership School - a private special-needs school
Bradbury School - an English Schools Foundation school
Buddhist Wong Cheuk Um Primary School
Hennessy Road Government Primary School
Hong Chi Lions Morninghill School - special-needs school for intellectual disability
Hong Kong Japanese School Primary Section
Jockey Club Hong Chi School - special-needs school for intellectual disability
Li Sing Tai Hang School
Lingnan Primary School and Kindergarten
le Lycée français international
Marymount Primary School
Po Kok Primary School
Po Leung Kuk Gold and Silver Exchange Society Pershing Tsang School
Precious Blood Primary School
Pun U Association Wah Yan Primary School
Raimondi College Primary Section
Rosaryhill School Primary Section
Sheng Kung Hui St. James' Primary School
Sir Ellis Kadoorie (Sookunpo) Primary School
St. Francis' Canossian School
St. Joseph's Primary School
St. Paul's Convent School (Primary Section)
St. Paul's Primary Catholic School
Starters School
True Light Middle School of Hong Kong (Primary Section)
Tung Wah Group of Hospitals Li Chi Ho Primary School

Wong Tai Sin District 
Primary schools in Wong Tai Sin District:

Baptist Rainbow Primary School
Bishop Ford Memorial School
Bishop Walsh Primary School
Canossa Primary School
Canossa Primary School (San Po Kong)
Caritas Pelletier School - school for social development
CCC Kei Tsz Primary School
CCC Kei Wa Primary School
Choi Wan St. Joseph's Primary School
Chun Tok School
Confucian Tai Shing Primary School
Good Hope Primary School cum Kindergarten
Ho Lap Primary School (Sponsored by Sik Sik Yuen)
Hong Kong Red Cross Margaret Trench School - special-needs school for physical disability
International Christian Quality Music Secondary and Primary School
Islamic Dharwood Pau Memorial Primary School
Ng Wah Catholic Primary School
Our Lady's Primary School
Po Leung Kuk Centenary School - special-needs school for intellectual disability
Po Leung Kuk Grandmont Primary School
Po Leung Kuk Mrs. Chan Nam Chong Memorial Primary School
Po Leung Kuk Stanley Ho Sau Nan Primary School
Po Yan Catholic Primary School
Price Memorial Catholic Primary School
Rhenish Church Grace School - special-needs school for intellectual disability
Sheng Kung Hui Ching Shan Primary School
Sheng Kung Hui Kei Tak Primary School
Sheng Kung Hui Yat Sau Primary School
St. Bonaventure Catholic Primary School
St. Patrick's Catholic Primary School (Po Kong Village Road)
St. Patrick's School
Tsz Wan Shan Catholic Primary School
Tsz Wan Shan St. Bonaventure Catholic Primary School
Wong Tai Sin Catholic Primary School
Wong Tai Sin Government Primary School

Yau Tsim Mong District 
Primary schools in Yau Tsim Mong District:
Canton Road Government Primary School
CCC Heep Woh Primary School
CCC Kei Tsun Primary School
CCC Mongkok Church Kai Oi School
CCC Wanchai Church Kei To Primary School
Diocesan Girls' Junior School
Fresh Fish Traders' School
G. T. (Ellen Yeung) College (Mong Kok Chi Kit Campus)
Jordan Road Government Primary School
Kowloon Women's Welfare Club Li Ping Memorial School
Methodist School
Po Leung Kuk Camões Tan Siu Lin Primary School
Sharon Lutheran School
Sheng Kung Hui Kei Wing Primary School
St. Mary's Canossian School
Tai Kok Tsui Catholic Primary School
Tai Kok Tsui Catholic Primary School (Hoi Fan Road)
Tak Sun School
Tong Mei Road Government Primary School
Tung Koon District Society Fong Shu Chuen School
Tung Wah Group of Hospitals Lo Yu Chik Primary School
Yaumati Catholic Primary School
Yaumati Catholic Primary School (Hoi Wang Road)
Yaumati Kaifong Association School

Yuen Long District 
Primary schools in Yuen Long District:
AD & FD POHL Leung Sing Tak School
Buddhist Chan Wing Kan Memorial School
Buddhist TCFS Yeung Yat Lam Memorial School - special-needs school for intellectual disability
Buddhist Wing Yan School
Caritas Lok Kan School - special-needs school for intellectual disability
CCC Chun Kwong Primary School
Chinese YMCA Primary School
Chiu Yang Por Yen Primary School
Chiu Yang Primary School of Hong Kong
Christian and Missionary Alliance Chui Chak Lam Memorial School
Christian Alliance S. Y. Yeh Memorial Primary School
Chung Sing School
Cumberland Presbyterian Church Yao Dao Primary School
Gigamind English Primary School
Ho Ming Primary School Sponsored by Sik Sik Yuen
Hong Chi Morningjoy School, Yuen Long - special-needs school for intellectual disability
Hong Chi Morninglight School, Yuen Long - special-needs school for intellectual disability
Hong Kong and Macau Lutheran Church Wong Chan Sook Ying Memorial School
HKFYG Lee Shau Kee Primary School
Hong Kong Student Aid Society Primary School
Kam Tin Mung Yeung Public School
Kwong Ming School
Kwong Ming Ying Loi School
Lions Clubs International Ho Tak Sum Primary School
Lok Sin Tong Leung Kau Kui Primary School
Lok Sin Tong Leung Kau Kui Primary School (Branch)
Pat Heung Central Primary School
Po Kok Branch School
Po Leung Kuk Law's Foundation school - special-needs school for intellectual disability
QES Old Students' Association Branch Primary School
QES Old Students' Association Primary School
Shap Pat Heung Rural Committee Kung Yik She Primary School
Sheng Kung Hui Kam Tin St. Joseph's Primary School
Sheng Kung Hui Ling Oi Primary School
Sheng Kung Hui Tin Shui Wai Ling Oi Primary School
Shun Tak Fraternal Association Wu Mien Tuen Primary School
South Yuen Long Government Primary School
Tin Shui Wai Catholic Primary School
Tin Shui Wai Government Primary School
Tin Shui Wai Methodist Primary School
Tun Yu School
Tung Tak School
Tung Wah Group of Hospitals Leo Tung-hai Lee Primary School
Tung Wah Group of Hospitals Yiu Dak Chi Memorial Primary School (Yuen Long)
Umah International Primary School
W F Joseph Lee Primary School (also known as Wo Foo Foundation Joseph Lee Primary School)
Xianggang Putonghua Yanxishe Primary School of Science and Creativity
Yuen Long Government Primary School
Yuen Long Long Ping Estate Tung Koon Primary School
Yuen Long Long Ping Estate Wai Chow School
Yuen Long Merchants Association Primary School
Yuen Long Public Middle School Alumni Association Primary School
Yuen Long Public Middle School Alumni Association Ying Yip Primary School

Others
Hong Kong Red Cross Hospital Schools - hospital school operating classes at 18 hospitals

See also
List of English Schools Foundation schools
List of international schools in Hong Kong
List of schools in Hong Kong
List of secondary schools in Hong Kong
List of special schools in Hong Kong
List of universities in Hong Kong

References
Primary School Profiles (HKEdCity)
Education Bureau: Special Education Services
EDB (Education Board of the Hong Kong government) list
Primary Schools of the English Schools Foundation

Primary
 
Hong Kong